Chulanur is a small village in Palakkad district of Kerala state, south India. Chulanur is famous for peacocks. Choolannur Peafowl Sanctuary, the only Peafowl sanctuary in Kerala is located in this village.

References

Villages in Palakkad district